Betrayal is a 2009 Norwegian historic action film directed by Håkon Gundersen, starring Fridtjov Såheim, Lene Nystrøm, Götz Otto and Kåre Conradi. The film is based on a true story.

Plot
During the German occupation of Norway, nightclub owner Tor Lindblom (Såheim) makes a fortune by collaborating with the Germans. With the help of SS-Sturmbannführer Krüger (Otto), he plans to exploit the construction of a new aluminium plant for his own benefit. At the same time he is also romantically involved with Eva Karlsen (Nystrøm), a singer at the nightclub, who is a British double agent.

Reception
Norwegian reviewers were generally negative in their view of Betrayal. In a review for newspaper Verdens Gang, Morten Ståle Nilsen gave it a "die throw" of two and called the film an "awkward amateur night". Ingunn Økland of Aftenposten gave it three points, calling it a "missed opportunity" to make what could have been "an important Norwegian war film".

References

External links
 
 Svik at Filmweb.no (Norwegian)
 Betrayal at the Norwegian Film Institute

2009 films
2009 action films
Norwegian action films
2000s Norwegian-language films